Pipra is a village in West Champaran district in the Indian state of Bihar.

Demographics
As of 2011 India census, Pipra had a population of 1466 in 253 households. Males constitute 53.3% of the population and females 46.6%. Pipra has an average literacy rate of 37.3%, lower than the national average of 74%: male literacy is 66.4%, and female literacy is 33.5%. In Pipra, 25.3% of the population is under 6 years of age.

References

Villages in West Champaran district